In enzymology, an endopolyphosphatase is an enzyme that catalyzes the chemical reaction

polyphosphate + n H2O  (n+1) oligophosphate

Thus, the two substrates of this enzyme are polyphosphate and H2O, whereas its product is oligophosphate.

This enzyme belongs to the family of hydrolases, specifically those acting on acid anhydrides in phosphorus-containing anhydrides.  The systematic name of this enzyme class is polyphosphate polyphosphohydrolase. Other names in common use include polyphosphate depolymerase, metaphosphatase, polyphosphatase, and polymetaphosphatase.

References

 
 

EC 3.6.1
Enzymes of unknown structure